Hsu Ta Tung (1909-1982), was a Chinese business magnate and the father of Daisy Hsu and Rita Fan.

Life
Hsu was born in Zhenhai County (current Zhenhai District), Ningbo, Zhejiang Province. His father was a teacher at Chongzheng College (崇正書院), and he also graduated from this school.

Hsu went to Shanghai and joined a bank as a clerk. Three years later he and founded his own company in the paper industry named Ta-Tung (大統紙號) after himself. His company developed rapidly and the company was renamed Tung-Yi (統益紙號). In the late 1930s and 40s, he monopolized the paper business in eastern China and was known as the 'Magnate of Paper Industry' (紙業大王). He became chief director (理事長) of the Shanghai Trade Association (上海同業公會).

Hsu invested broadly in other sectors including banking and real estate. He became the major shareholder of Dah Sing Bank, established in Hong Kong in 1947 as mainland China turned communist.

His daughters Daisy Hsu and Rita Fan were born in Shanghai, with the latter named after American film star Rita Hayworth, who was then very popular in Shanghai.

Hong Kong 
1949, Hsu moved his whole family to Hong Kong.  He once became the largest single shareholder of Dah Sing Bank Limited. The number plate of his car was also famous in Hong Kong - HK1000. In later life he was involved in the charitable promotion of education in mainland China.

Memorial
 Ta-Tung Bridge (大統橋) in Ningbo
 Hsu Ta Tung Memorial Building, at St. Stephen's Girls' College, Hong Kong

References

1909 births
1982 deaths
Businesspeople from Ningbo